Monica Lovinescu (19 November 1923 – 20 April 2008) was a Romanian essayist, short story writer, literary critic, translator, and journalist, noted for her activities as an opponent of the Romanian Communist regime. She published several works under the pseudonyms Monique Saint-Come and Claude Pascal.  She is the daughter of literary figure Eugen Lovinescu. She was married to the literary critic Virgil Ierunca.

Lovinescu was born in Bucharest. A graduate of the University of Bucharest's Faculty of Letters, she made her literary debut in Vremea magazine, regularly publishing prose works in Revista Fundațiilor Regale and theater chronicles in Democrația. The rapid steps undertaken towards the establishing of an overtly communist rule in Romania forced her to take refuge in France: going there on a French government-sponsored scholarship in September 1947, she asked (in August 1948) for political asylum after Romania became a People's Republic.

She published extensively on the subject of communism in her country, as well as works on Romanian literature. Her articles were frequently featured in prestigious magazines such as Kontinent, Les Cahiers de l'Est, and L'Alternative. She contributed the Romanian chapter of the collection of essays titled Histoire des spectacles (published by Éditions Gallimard).

Between 1951 and 1974, Lovinescu was a contributor for Romanian language broadcasts of the Radiodiffusion Française, as well as a member of the station's staff for Eastern Europe. From the 1960s onwards, she was a journalist for Radio Free Europe, creating two weekly pieces that were influential in generating an internal opposition to the Nicolae Ceaușescu regime. Their main purpose was to inform Romanians of cultural and political trends on in the Free World. Part of the broadcast scripts were published as Unde Scurte ("Shortwaves"), in Madrid (1978).

She was the target of violent attacks in the Romanian communist press, the most notable of them being carried out by journalists Eugen Barbu and Corneliu Vadim Tudor. Romanian defector Ion Mihai Pacepa claimed that in 1977 she was severely beaten by three Palestine Liberation Organization officers, one disguised as a French mailman, allegedly at the direction of Ceaușescu.

Lovinescu also translated several Romanian literary works into French.

She died in Paris.

References

1923 births
2008 deaths
Romanian expatriates in France
Journalists from Bucharest
Radio Free Europe/Radio Liberty people
Romanian defectors
Romanian essayists
Romanian literary critics
Romanian women literary critics
Romanian translators
Romanian writers
Romanian writers in French
University of Bucharest alumni
Romanian women essayists
20th-century translators
20th-century Romanian women writers
20th-century essayists
20th-century journalists
Romanian anti-communists
Romanian women journalists